Conversations is an album by saxophonist Archie Shepp with Kahil El'Zabar's Ritual Trio, which also includes Ari Brown and  Malachi Favors, which was recorded in 1999 and released on the Delmark label.

Reception

In his review for AllMusic, Michael G. Nastos notes "In a dedication to the late bassist Fred Hopkins, Shepp returns to the recording studio armed with his no-compromise, no-nonsense way of playing the tenor saxophone. It's still as cutting-edge dour as ever, supported by the beautiful underpinnings of the trio ... To say Shepp is back would be shortsighted; he's always been around ... This is a resolute affirmation of his powers, punctuating that he's still a vital force in the new music, as are his backup constituents on this very fine CD, a perfect introduction for the uninitiated and a must-buy for longtime fans" On All About Jazz, Jack Bowers said "There are few pyrotechnics; much of the music is pensive and sedate, and most of it is melodic as well. While this isn’t the sort of disc I’d run out and buy, there are many who would, and to them I would unreservedly recommend it".

Track listing
All compositions by Kahil El'Zabar except where noted
 "Conversation; the Introduction" – 8:11
 "Big Fred" – 8:20
 "Kari" – 8:30
 "Whenever I Think of You" (Ari Brown) – 9:27
 "Conversations; the Dialogue" – 10:11
 "Brother Malcolm" – 8:18
 "Revelations" – 7:42

Personnel
Archie Shepp – tenor saxophone, piano
Kahil El'Zabar – drums
Ari Brown – piano, tenor saxophone
Malachi Favors – bass

References

1999 albums
Kahil El'Zabar albums
Archie Shepp albums
Delmark Records albums
Albums produced by Bob Koester
Collaborative albums